Roger Suggs, better known as the rapper Vigalantee, is an emcee, speaker, and social activist based in Kansas City, Kansas. Through his music and activism, Vigalantee has been involved in crusading for human, civil, and labor rights, as well as several outreach programs designed to keep area youths out of prison. Vigalantee owns PhatAhDat Records, an independent label. He has stated in interviews that he took the name "Vigalantee" from the comic book character, Spider-Man, who attempts to help people but is still constantly under the threat of arrest from the police.

Biography

Early life
Vigalantee was born in Chicago, but spent the majority of his childhood in a small town in Georgia, where he had a daily reminder of racism and segregation. He recalls watching his grandfather "walking like a sharecropper," and living close to poverty, dynamics that made him aware of his second-class citizenship status. As he grew older, he realized that his experience was shared by many blacks living in the South, and came to understand that if blacks could have a shared experience of oppression, they could likewise band together with a common agenda and a solid community to empower themselves out of the de facto racism. In interviews, he often references these painful memories and realizations as the backbone of his present-day activism.

Musical career

Style and influence

Vigalantee's' stylistic signature is the use of acronyms in titles of his albums and songs, such as M.I.S.E.R.Y. and A.N.I.M.A.L. Referred to as the Acronym King, Suggs believes acronyms are easier for the intended recipients of his message. "People relate to it better and it sticks to the mind easier," Vigalantee has said. It's a God-given gift."

Musically and professionally, Vigalantee has been influenced by a wide array of artists, from Curtis Mayfield to Canibus. Vigalantee has publicly expressed his belief that music is the gateway to establishing profound social change, and that these acts create "thought provoking music" as to a way to educate their listeners while also entertaining them. Lyrically, he cites Chuck D, LL Cool J, and Poor Righteous Teachers as integral influences.

Not surprisingly, Vigalantee relies on his albums to make political and social statements. His songs have often contained controversial themes innate to the human experience, such as poverty, racism, prejudice, sexism, religion, murder, justice, religion, civil rights, and politics. In numerous interviews, Vigalantee has expressed his belief in using music as a way to critique social inequalities and establish change. His solo career has largely encouraged his fans to consider their role in being part of that change, asking them to be "called" to action, rather than driven, to turn activism into action.

Much like Jay-Z and 50 Cent, Vigalantee has also branched into entrepreneurial pursuits, most recently in crossing over to the literary world. His first book, an autobiography entitled The Greatest Story That was Never Heard Til Now, is due out in March 2011. A second book, Love, Lust, Defeat, Deceit, a collection of his poetry, is currently seeking a publisher while looking for a spring release date.

Social and political views

Vigalantee considers himself to be a social activist, a role that has distinguished his music from that of his peers. While he's commented on a number of issues pertaining to social injustice, Vigalantee felt a particular stirring in regards to the unsolved murder of 14-year-old Emmett Till. The black Till was lynched during a visit to Mississippi relatives for allegedly whistling at a white woman, and his brutal death is credited with starting the Civil Rights Movement that would define the 1950s and 60's. Shortly before Congress enacted the Emmett Till Civil Rights Bill, Vigalantee recorded an eponymous single sharing the teen's story, feeling a connection to Till's journey from Chicago into the deep South. Vigalantee notes that, while popular artists have all name-dropped Emmett Till in their songs, "the true story of Emmett Till has never really been told," ultimately concluding, "young people don't know nothing about Emmett Till."

Vigalantee has also worked to equalize treatment between the sexes, openly disagreeing with how women are treated in modern forms of entertainment and the media. In response to criticisms that there is a decisive lack of respectful depictions of women in popular hip-hop and rap, Vigalantee sought to deconstruct the traditional treatment of women with his album, "A Second is a Lifetime." One single in particular, "Beautiful Black Woman," encourages listeners to adopt a more compassionate approach to the treatment of women around the globe.

No Jaangle and F.B.O.E.

Though music has been a constant companion in Vigalantee's life, Vigalantee has been performing professionally since 1993. Since 1994, Vigalantee has owned and operated PhatAhDat Records. His independent label has allowed to focus on delivering his agenda with his music, rather than be censored to reflect social trends. With the resources of PhatAhDat, Vigalantee also pioneered the No Jaangle Movement, a social consciousness movement that challenges young people to combat the stigma of "bojangling," a negative stereotype that haunts most minority youths. With the No Jaangle Movement, Vigalantee hopes to motivate folks to realize ignorance isn't a component of success. Vigalantee formed an alliance with a collection of gifted teachers, students, and talented volunteers to help young people establish financial stability, network with community contacts, and gain a sense of purpose.  "It means never compromising who you are, and realizing that you don't have to be ignorant to be successful. It also means respecting and recognizing those who've walked before you, taking the black face of shame off, combating "Bojangling".

Vigalantee is also the co-founder of the Fringe Benefits Of Education (F.B.O.E.), a program geared towards empowering young people around the Kansas City in achieving their dreams[5]. Recognizing a noticeable gap in resources available for young men in the 17 to 22 age demographic, Fringe Benefits of Education networks to provide scholarship opportunities and support groups. To date, the program has also been endowed with a $10,000 grant from Kansas City Kansas Community College.

Discography

Poor Man Story
No Jaangle Movement
A.N.I.M.A.L (A Nation in Misery Alienated and Lost)
M.I.R.A.C.L.E (Music Inspiring Real Accomplishment Creating Love Everlasting)
A Second is a Lifetime

Film work
Kansas City (1996 film)

References

External links
 

American rappers
Living people
Rappers from Chicago
21st-century American rappers
Year of birth missing (living people)